María Calderón Fernandez (born 23 March 1997) is a Spanish professional racing cyclist who rides for Lointek.

See also
 List of 2016 UCI Women's Teams and riders

References

External links
 

1997 births
Living people
Spanish female cyclists
Place of birth missing (living people)